St. Andrew's College (SAC) is an independent boarding and day school founded in 1899 and located in Aurora, Ontario, Canada. It is a university-preparatory school for boys in grades 5 to 12, with a focus on academic achievement, athletics, and leadership development. It is accredited by the Canadian Educational Standards Institute and is affiliated with other associations, including CAIS, CASE, NAIS and the International Boys' Schools Coalition (IBSC). The school's coat of arms was registered with the Canadian Heraldic Authority on August 15, 2006.

St. Andrew's College was first situated at the northeast corner of Yonge Street and Roxborough Avenue in the Toronto neighbourhood of Rosedale, in a house named Chestnut Park that was previously owned by Sir David Macpherson. In 1905, the school moved within Rosedale to an area west of MacLennan Avenue, from Summerhill Avenue to Douglas Drive just north of Rosedale Field, in a large Collegiate Gothic structure. The school made its final move in 1926 to Aurora, where the current campus occupies a  site in a suburban environment. Its Georgian Revival architecture is built around the traditional quadrangle form. There are four boarding houses on campus, which is home to approximately half of the 651 boys. Many members of the faculty also live on-campus.

It was this Aurora campus that was featured in the 5th episode of the Netflix mini-series The Queen's Gambit.

Academics

The School's mission statement is Dedicating ourselves to the development of the complete man, the well-rounded citizen. Every classroom and common area at St. Andrew's College is covered by a wireless network. The faculty is divided into 12 departments, those being Business, Computer Science and Engineering, Drama, English, Guidance and Career Education, Health and Physical Education, Mathematics, Modern Languages, Music, Science, Visual Arts, and World Studies.

The students have a broad selection of courses to choose from, from the fine arts, to the humanities and social sciences, to science and engineering. Many AP examinations are also offered, examples being AP Chemistry, AP Capstone, AP Calculus, AP Statistics, AP Economics, AP Biology, AP Computer science, among others. SAC has a 100% university acceptance rate and graduates move on to post-secondary education around the world, including Canadian, American and British universities.

In addition to academics, there exists a large number of student-run clubs and cultural societies, and faculty-led extracurricular activities and councils.

Students
St. Andrew's College is divided into the Middle School (grades 5-8), and the Upper School (grades 9-12). More than half the students from over 29 countries attending St. Andrew's College live in boarding. Upper School day boys from York Region and the surrounding area, are a part of the four day houses: Ramsey, Laidlaw, Smith or Perrier.  Macdonald House is the home to all grade 5-9 boarders, and some select grade 11's who are designated house captains and act as 'big brothers'. The remaining Upper School boarders live in the remaining 3 boarding houses: Flavelle, Sifton, and Memorial. The programs for Middle School students are generally independent of those for Upper School. Each Middle School student is also part of a clan, where they participate in various activities to earn Clan Points. The clans are Douglas, Montrose, Wallace, and Bruce.

In addition, St. Andrew's students hail from an array of different backgrounds. Half of the School's student body are boarders and nearly 50% of the boarding community is international, coming from such countries and regions as Bermuda, Korea, Bahamas, Mexico, Hong Kong, Japan, Taiwan, the Philippines, Germany, Indonesia, Spain, Bermuda, China, Nepal and the United States to name a few. The remaining half are from various provinces across Canada.

Facilities

Design and additions 
In 1999 the architectural firm KPMB headed a project which consisted of planning for a new middle school and parking lot on the established campus. From 2000 to 2003, the same architectural firm had an additional project which included the addition of a middle school wing onto an existing building, a parking lot and outdoor spaces and alterations to the existing college, originally constructed in 1926. The plans for these projects are currently kept at the Canadian Centre for Architecture in Montreal, Quebec.

Academic facilities
The Center for Leadership, Innovation, and Performance (CLIP) - A fairly new 3-level addition to the campus (2015), which is home to the Business, Geography, Drama, and Music classrooms. The main music classroom/band room is the rehearsal space for the School's Wind Ensemble, Symphonic Band, and Jazz Band, along with the Upper School music classes. All of the school plays are held in the Wirth Theatre, a state-of-the-art facility modelled after Stratford's Festival Theatre that is equipped with a thrust stage and balcony seats. The Reininger Rehearsal space is situated under the Wirth Theatre, and is where the drama classes are held in addition to playing a supporting role for the School's Fall Play, and being used as a performance venue during the FOCUS Festival of the Arts. Ramsay House lockers are in the basement of CLIP across from the Geography classrooms. The CLIP provides a connection from the Staunton Gallery to the Cole Dining Hall.

Coulter Hall - A three-floor classroom building opened in 1962—the second and third floor is designated for use by the Math and English departments, respectively. The first floor (or basement) houses the office for the mathematics faculty, while also serving as a link between the north end of the Staunton Gallery, and the basements of Dunlap Hall and the CLIP building.

McLaughlin Hall - A three-story wing connecting the Bedard Athletic Centre, Coulter Hall, and Rogers Hall, originally opened in 1971. It has since been renovated, both in 1985 and 2021. It is completely devoted to science-related studies. The first floor is home to computer science, computer engineering, robotics, and a 'Maker Space' which can also be used as a performance venue during the FOCUS Festival of the Arts. There are also several glass 'breakout rooms' for collaborative work. The second floor is home to biology and general science, as well as the faculty office, and the third floor is home to chemistry and physics. The hall also features a permanently installed Focault pendulum, one of only a handful in Canada. A separate older wing off of McLaughlin Hall above the reception area houses the classrooms for the social science courses, including Civics, History, Law, Politics, etc.

Prior to the extensive 2021 renovation, the first floor was designated for geographic studies, and housed the Donald Davis Theatre (since turned into the Maker Space). The second floor was designated for biological studies and computer science, with the third for mathematics, chemistry and physics.

Rogers Hall - Built in 2003, this is a classroom wing devoted entirely to the Middle School. All Middle School classes take place here, save for music and art. It is named after lead donor Dem Rogers '59.

Wirth Art Gallery - A facility designed to house the visual arts and media arts departments for the School. It was named after Old Boy Alf Wirth '59.

Student and school facilities
Ackerman Field - named after Gordon Edwin Ackerman, a former football coach and teacher at the college, the Ackerman Field is one of the School's lower fields.

Bedard Athletic Centre - This building, opened in 1979 (with an addition in 1990) and named after the School's sixth Headmaster, Robert Bedard, is home to many of SAC's athletic needs. It houses one of the two gymnasiums on campus, as well as 6 international squash courts, a 25-metre six lane indoor swimming pool, a fitness and weight training facility, 10 locker rooms, and a fully staffed sports injury/athletic therapist clinic. The Modern Languages Department teaches French and Spanish in the second-floor classrooms of the building, with Health and Physical Education classes taking place in the gymnasium. Since September 2022, it also houses a donated golf simulator.

Cole Hall - The dining hall where breakfast, lunch, and dinner are served daily. It is also the site for many formal meals and ceremonies, like the annual St. Andrew's Day lunch & dinner in November. The Cadet stores and offices are now located in the basement of Cole Hall.

Dunlap Hall - This is one of the original four buildings on campus. Today it houses the School's administrative facility. Dunlap Hall is separated into two floors: the first serves numerous functions including the Headmaster's office, admission office, administration office, and university counselling. It is also serves as a connection to the library. The second floor houses the alumni and advancement office and the business office. In the basement are the day boy lockers as well as a multi-faith prayer room.

High Ropes Course - The high ropes course is the School's only rope course and is frequently used to train the School's cadets, especially those in grade 12 who wish to become cadet instructors, where completing the high ropes course is mandatory.

Ketchum Auditorium - The School's auditorium, adjacent to Coulter Hall. It is named after the third headmaster Kenneth G. B. Ketchum LLD.

Memorial Chapel - The School's Chapel, which is dedicated to the Andreans who fought and died during World War I and II. The donation was made by Sir Joseph Flavelle, who also donated funds to establish Flavelle House. Morning services for character building as well as some special services like the Remembrance Day Service are held in the Memorial Chapel.

Petrachek McGillivray Pipes & Drums Centre - The home of the School's esteemed Pipes & Drums Program. Piping and Drumming classes also take place here.

Quadrangle (The Quad) - Located directly in front of the boarding houses, the quad is supposed to represent the sacred ground at St. Andrew's, and is used to host Prize Day in June and the annual Cadet inspection in May. However, students are allowed to use the quad for athletic purposes at designated times during the day.

Staunton Gallery - A now-covered outdoor courtyard, it is a main part of the School where many students congregate, and was dedicated to departing Headmaster Ted Staunton. It has connections to the Wirth Art Gallery, Dunlap Hall, Ketchum Auditorium, Coulter Hall, CLIP, McLaughlin Hall, and Rogers Hall.

Towers Library - the School's library. It is named after Graham Towers, the first governor of the Bank of Canada, and an Old Boy.

Yuill Family Gymnasium - The main athletic facility for all Middle School students, and it is attached to Rogers Hall. It is also used for some Upper School activities as well, usually after-school sports practices or games. Upper School June exams are held here. Moreover, the Yuill gym is home to a rock wall. It was named after Old Boy Bill Yuill '57.

Yuill Family Athletic Complex - The upper fields of the School. Consists of a state of the art synthetic turf field, with an 800-seat stadium, press box, and scoreboard. Surrounding the field is a 6-lane regulation track. The complex also includes a regulation-size baseball diamond, batting cages, warm-up mounds, and multipurpose athletic courts (including tennis and basketball). The complex was completed in Spring of 2012 and is named for its lead donor, Old Boy Bill Yuill '57.

La Brier Family Arena - A new hockey arena. It is being used for U12, U14, U16, U18AAA (formerly JV) and 1st (Varsity) hockey. Boarding students can also get open ice time in select evenings. Built and completed in 2014, it is the cornerstone in the athletic program and is named for its lead donor, the La Brier Family.

Boarding facilities
In addition to the School's academic and athletic facilities, there are four boarding facilities for the boarding students at St. Andrew's. They are:
 Memorial House — named after the soldiers who died during World War I and World War II.
 Flavelle House — named after Sir Joseph Flavelle.
 MacDonald House — named after the MacDonald family (J. K. MacDonald and J. K. MacDonald II both served as Board Chair and Bruce MacDonald was Headmaster).
 Sifton House — named after the School's prolific alumni and donors, the Sifton family, descended from Sir Clifford Sifton.

Cadet Corps
St. Andrew's is also home to Canada's second largest Royal Canadian Army Cadets Corps. Established in 1905, the #142 St. Andrew's College Highland Cadet Corps is now a credit earning, multi-year leadership program, but still culminates in an annual inspection in May. The School's cadet corps is also affiliated with the 48th Highlanders of Canada, retaining the same motto ("Dileas Gu Brath" - "Faithful Forever") as well as uniform (scarlet tunic and Modern Gordon tartan). In 2005, the centennial year, the Corps was granted the Freedom of the City of Aurora.

The Pipes and Drums Band is an integral part of the St. Andrew's College Highland Cadet Corps and one of its best-known elements. The primary responsibility of the Pipes and Drums Band is to provide music for the Battalion when it is on the march. In this role, the Band will be front and centre at the Annual Church Parade, the Headmaster's Parade, and the Annual Inspection in May.

The Cadet Corps closely resembles that of the Canadian army. Beginning from grade 9, all students at St. Andrew's must participate in either the Cadet program or the Music program (consisting of both the Pipes & Drums and the Wind Bands). Those who wish to further pursue their leadership position in the Cadet Corps can either become platoon instructors or apply for senior positions within the corps. There are four mandatory levels in the cadet program, which accompanies each grade, and they are as follows:
Green Star (grade 8) - if the student passes the final Green Star exam, he will be promoted from a cadet to a lance corporal.
Red Star (grade 9) - if the student passes the final Red Star exam, he will be promoted from a lance corporal to a corporal.
Silver Star (grade 10) - if the student passes the final Silver Star exam, he will be promoted from a corporal to a master corporal.
Gold Star (grade 11) - if the student passes the final Gold Star exam, he will be promoted from a master corporal to a sergeant.
Cadets can be eligible for further promotion to higher NCO and officer ranks by completing Master Cadet certification. Promotions are made usually at the beginning of the school year with further promotions at the start of the parade season.

As well, the St. Andrew's College Cadet Corps has won a multitude of awards. It won the Strathcona Cup for general efficiency of private school cadet corps in
1944, 1945, 1947, 1954, 1955, 1961, 1964, 1967, 1973, 1980, 1981 and 1983. Moreover, it won the Earl Grey Challenge Trophy for the Best Cadet Corps in Canada in 1960–1961.

Rank structure
Similar to the Canadian Forces, a Cadet can be promoted on merit gained through Cadet accreditation and leadership within the corps. The rank structure is equivalent to that of the Royal Canadian Army Cadets; the Cadet Corps is one of only a few Cadet Corps in Canada which still keeps Cadets officers ranks.

Piping and Drumming
In addition to the normal Cadet Corps, the Pipes & Drums are also paramount to the School's Cadet Corps. Internationally renowned as "North America's piping heartland" for its Piping and Drumming program, St. Andrew's College attracts hundreds of potential pipers each year to its summer "Ontario School of Piping and Drumming at St. Andrew’s College" camp.

Like the Cadets in the Royal Canadian Army Cadets program, pipers and drummers can elevate their rank in the same way that the normal school Cadets do.

In June 2019, the decision was made to field a competitive band in grade 3 alongside the existing band, which competed in grade 5.

School events
Each year, St. Andrew's hosts' certain events that are special only to the School. Some of these activities and events involve the School's entire student body, while others invite alumni and their friends and families. These events serve different purposes, some of which are integral to the School's identity while others are used for fundraising causes.

Annual Cadet Inspection - the annual Cadet Inspection is mandatory for the entire student body at St. Andrew's. The Inspection is usually held in May and invites prominent representatives from all across Canada to inspect the School's Cadet Corps. A tradition that finds its root since 1906, the annual inspection is integral to the School's identity and preserving both the School's Scottish background, and the history of the Cadet Corps.
An Andrean Christmas - The annual Andrean Christmas is held at Roy Thompson Hall in December and showcases the School's musicians and singers. The Hall holds over 2,000 people and is generally filled to capacity. Like the annual Cadet Inspection, the Andrean Christmas is mandatory and everybody from the student body must attend. It replaces the tradition of an annual Carol Service in the holiday season.
Focus Festival of the Arts - This program is a three-day festival of plays, a film festival, visual arts, music and social events for students, parents and guests. Boys who have never been involved in drama or on the stage before are encouraged to participate by writing their own plays, directing, producing or acting in performances large and small.
Annual Fall Play - An annual Broadway-level play put on for parents, students, and staff during the month of November in the Wirth Theatre. Generally a Musical.
Celtic Concert - This musical concert showcases the School's Pipes and Drums and feature many school bands, plus outstanding soloists, percussionists and dancers. It highlights traditional Celtic music, military band music, and some show tunes.
Homecoming - an annual gathering of all St. Andrew's alumni to return to St. Andrew's in September. Held in conjunction with the 5, 10, 15, 20, 25, 30, 35, 40, 45 reunion dinners, this annual gathering is for the entire Andrean community. The Homecoming celebration includes games for the children in the Quad and in the Great Hall, and various sports competitions, culminating in the annual 1st Football match against rivals UCC, Yuill Turf Field. For Upper School students, the Homecoming event usually includes the annual Homecoming dance on Saturday evening.
MacPherson Tournament - an annual hockey event where the St. Andrew's varsity hockey team competes with hockey teams from other top schools for the MacPherson Cup. The cup is named after three Andreans: Lloyd MacPherson, Jim Hamilton and Bob Meagher, all of whom loved hockey with passion and contributed greatly to the St. Andrew's hockey team. The tournament has a North American flavour, hosting schools from Saskatchewan, New Brunswick, New Hampshire, Massachusetts, Quebec, Indiana, Pennsylvania, Ohio, Florida, New York, Nova Scotia and Michigan as well as a variety of regions in Ontario.
Prize Day - Prize Day is the culmination of the School's academic year, and features many awards and prizes earned by the School's students. There are two ceremonies, one for the Middle School and one for the Upper School. Prize Day takes place after exams, which are usually completed by early June.
St. Andrew's Dinner - every November, a traditional St. Andrew's night dinner is held, complete with Haggis. All students must attend, wearing their kilts for this special occasion. Like the annual Cadet Inspection, the St. Andrew's Dinner has taken place since the inception of the School and is integral to the preservation of the School's Scottish traditions.

Clans
Middle School Clans:
Bruce Clan
Douglas Clan
Wallace Clan
Montrose Clan

Students in a particular Upper School house, both day and boarding, are in the same clan.

Upper School Clans:
MacPherson Clan, Flavelle House
Buchanan Clan, Memorial House
Chattan Clan, Smith House
Ramsay Clan, Ramsey House
Robertson Clan, Laidlaw House
Stewart Clan, Sifton House
Craig Clan, Perrier House
MacDonald Clan, MacDonald House

Athletics
Sports are considered an essential part of school life and culture; 72 teams across 22 sports are offered by the School. St. Andrew's College is one of the original members of Ontario's “Little Big Four” (the others being Ridley College, Trinity College School, and Upper Canada College). The photographs of each year's representative teams line the walls along the first and second floors of the Bedard Athletic Centre. Sports are mandatory — all Upper School boys must participate in two out of three sports terms during the year, while Middle School students must participate in all three terms.

St. Andrew's has a tradition of sporting, as shown by its participation in both private and public school leagues and associations:
Private schools competition
Little Big Four (L.B.F.) 1899-1968
Independent School League (I.S.L.) 1968-1982
Independent Schools Athletic Association (I.S.A.A.) 1982-1993
Conference of Independent Schools Athletic Association (C.I.S.A.A.)1993–present
Canadian Association of Independent Schools (C.A.I.S.) 1981–present
Public schools competition
York Region Secondary Schools Athletic Association (Y.R.S.S.A.A.) 1971-1995
Georgian Bay Secondary Schools Athletic Association (G.B.S.S.A.A.) 1973-1986
Durham-York Secondary Schools Athletic Association (D.Y.S.S.A.A.) 1986-1995
York Region Athletic Association (Y.R.A.A.) 1995-2004
Ontario Federation of School Athletic Associations (O.F.S.A.A.) 1948–present

St. Andrew's College has representative teams for the following sports, in addition to multiple intramural options:

Fall
Football
Cross country
Soccer
Volleyball
Ultimate Frisbee

Winter
Alpine skiing
Basketball
Biathlon
Curling
Fencing
Hockey
Nordic skiing
Squash
Swimming
Table tennis

Spring
Badminton
Baseball
Cricket
Golf
Lacrosse
Rugby
Tennis
Track and field
Triathlon

Headmasters
Reverend George Bruce (1899–1900)
Reverend Bruce Macdonald (1900–1935)
Kenneth Ketchum (1935–1958)
Dr. Joseph Robert Coulter (1958–1974)
Dr. Thomas Hockin (1974–1981)
Robert Bédard (1981–1997)
E.G. (Ted) Staunton (1997–2009)
Kevin McHenry (2009–present)

Notable faculty
Robert Bédard (tennis), the sixth Headmaster, was Canada's top-ranked tennis player for two decades
Thomas Cossitt, a former member of the House of Commons of Canada
Thomas Hockin, the fifth Headmaster, was a professor in political science and a renowned politician under the Progressive Conservative government. He went on to be the chief executive officer at the Investment Funds Institute of Canada, and in 2009 became the Executive Director of the International Monetary Fund
Frank Miller, former Premier of Ontario (Progressive Conservative, February–June 1985)

Notable alumni

St. Andrew's notable alumni, known colloquially at the school as 'Old Boys', include:

Arts
Stephen Amell - Canadian actor
Timothy Findley, OC - author
Lawren Harris, CC - Group of Seven Painter
George Nozuka - Canadian/American Pop and R&B singer/songwriter
Justin Nozuka - Canadian/American Folk singer/songwriter
Kiefer Sutherland - Canadian actor

Business
 Anthony S. Fell - Businessman, Order of Canada
 John A. McDougald - Businessman, Argus Corporation
 Rob McEwen, CC - Prolific entrepreneur
 Graham Towers, CC - Former Governor of the Bank of Canada
 John Draper (Jack) Perrin, Jr., T/Lt. Royal Navy
 Austin Cotterell Taylor - Mining Executive

Media
 Jack McClelland, OC - Publisher
 Alastair Sweeny PhD - Historian, publisher

Military
 Charles S.L. Hertzberg - Major General, Chief Engineer of the First Canadian Army, and commander of the Canadian Engineering Corps during the Second World War. Prominent engineer with many works.
 H.F.H Hertzberg - Major General and Commandant of Royal Military College (1940-1944)
 Frank McEachren - Colonel and aide-de-camp to six Lieutenant Governors of Ontario

Politics 
Thomas Cossitt - A member of the House of Commons of Canada.
John Crosbie PC, OC, QC - Politician, and the 12th Lieutenant-Governor of Newfoundland and Labrador (2008–2013).
Alan Milliken Heisey Sr. - North York Alderman and publisher.
Peter Hyndman - Member of the Legislative Assembly of British Columbia (1979-1983)
Vincent Massey, PC, CH, CC, philanthropist and 18th Governor General of Canada (first Canadian born; 1952–59).
John Alexander Douglas McCurdy - Member of the Aerial Experiment Association, inventor of the aileron, and the 19th Lieutenant Governor of Nova Scotia (1947–1952).
Roy McMurtry - Politician and Chief Justice of Ontario (1996–2007).
Frank Moores - Former Premier of Newfoundland and Labrador (1971–1979).
Edward Roberts CM, QC - The 11th Lieutenant-Governor of Newfoundland and Labrador (2002–2008).

Science
Gilbert de B. Robinson - Mathematician

Sports
Thaine Carter - Linebacker, formerly practiced with the Winnipeg Blue Bombers.
Steve Gainey - hockey player, formerly for the Phoenix Coyotes.
Greg Hotham - hockey player for the Pittsburgh Penguins and Toronto Maple Leafs.
Gord MacFarlane - retired minor-league hockey player
Karl McCartney - football player, currently playing for the Calgary Stampeders
Brad Smith - football player, played for the Edmonton Eskimos and the Montreal Alouettes
Warren Foegele - hockey player, currently playing in the Edmonton Oilers organization
Peter Godber - football player, currently playing for the BC Lions
Tyler Sikura - hockey player, currently playing in the Chicago Blackhawks organization
Dylan Sikura - hockey player, currently playing in the Chicago Blackhawks organization
Michael Del Zotto - hockey player, currently playing in the Anaheim Ducks organization
Alex Newhook - hockey player, college hockey for Boston College. Drafted 16th overall by the Colorado Avalanche in the 2019 NHL Entry Draft.

Notes

 ^http://www.mhs.mb.ca/docs/people/perrin_jd2.shtml
 ^https://archive.org/stream/msstandrewscolle1934stanuoft#page/80/mode/2up
 ^https://archive.org/stream/msstandrewscolle1934stanuoft#page/54/mode/2up

References
 Scoular, William (1998): Not An Ordinary Place: A St. Andrew's Century, St. Andrew's College.

External links

142 St. Andrew's College Highland Cadet Corps
Ontario School of Piping and Drumming

Boys' schools in Canada
Christian schools in Canada
Boarding schools in Ontario
Private schools in Ontario
Preparatory schools in Ontario
High schools in the Regional Municipality of York
Education in Aurora, Ontario
Educational institutions established in 1899
1899 establishments in Ontario